Comet SWAN most often refers to:

 C/2020 F8 (SWAN), a comet visible from Earth in 2020

It may also refer to other comets named for the SWAN instrument:

 C/2006 M4 (SWAN)
 C/2009 F6, Comet Yi-SWAN

 C/2012 E2

 C/2015 F3
 C/2015 F5 (SWAN-XingMing)

 273P/Pons-Gambart, recovered in SWAN data in November 2012 and temporarily thought to be a new discovery until orbital calculations revealed it to be a comet last seen in 1827